The 1971 McNeese State Cowboys football team was an American football team that represented McNeese State University as an independent during the 1971 NCAA College Division football season. In their second year under head coach Jack Doland, the team compiled an overall record of 9–1–1 and lost to Tennessee State in the Grantland Rice Bowl.

Schedule

References

McNeese State
McNeese Cowboys football seasons
McNeese State Cowboys football